Samm-Art Williams (born Samuel Arthur Williams; January 20, 1946) is an American playwright and screenwriter, and a stage and film/TV actor and television producer. Much of his work concerns the African-American experience.

He was nominated for a Tony Award and a Drama Desk Award for his play Home (1979), which moved from the Negro Ensemble Company to a Broadway production in 1980. In the mid-1980s, he received two Emmy nominations for his work for TV series.  The Black Rep of St. Louis, Missouri produced the premier of his play The Montford Point Marine (2011).

Biography

Early life and career
Samm-Art Williams was born in 1946 in Burgaw, North Carolina, the son of Samuel and Valdosia Williams. His mother was a school teacher, and Williams attended segregated public schools through high school.

As Samm Williams, he entered New York City theater as an actor in 1973, performing in the play Black Jesus. With New York's Negro Ensemble Company (NEC), Williams appeared in such plays as Nowhere to Run, Nowhere to Hide (St. Mark's Playhouse, 1974) and Liberty Calland (St. Mark's Playhouse, 1975), before taking on the name Samm-Art Williams for Argus and Klansman and Waiting for Mongo (St. Mark's Playhouse, 1975).

Williams, a 6' 8" lefty, was once a sparring partner of boxer Muhammad Ali. Samm was recruited to work with Ali, who was afraid of lefties.

Other early New York acting experience includes understudy work in Leslie Lee's Tony Award-nominated Broadway play The First Breeze of Summer (Palace Theatre, June 7 - July 19, 1975); Eden (St. Mark's Playhouse, 1976), The Brownsville Raid (Theatre de Lys, 1976–77), Night Shift (Playhouse Theatre, 1977), and Black Body Blues (St. Mark's Playhouse, 1978). His early work in regional theater includes Nevis Mountain Dew at the Arena Stage in Washington, D.C. (1979).

He made his screen debut playing "Roger" in the Richard Price novel adaptation The Wanderers (1979), and played a subway police officer in director Brian De Palma's Dressed to Kill (1980). An earlier film, the independent blaxploitation feature The Baron, a.k.a. Baron Wolfgang von Tripps and Black Cue, made circa 1977, was released direct-to-video by Paragon Video in 1996.

As Samm Williams, he wrote the play Welcome to Black River, produced by the Negro Ensemble Company (NEC) at St. Mark's Playhouse in 1975; and as Samm-Art Williams, The Coming and Do Unto Others, both at the Billie Holiday Theatre in Brooklyn in 1976; A Love Play produced by the NEC that same year; The Last Caravan (1977); and Brass Birds Don't Sing, at New York City's Stage 73 in 1978.

Williams participated in the NEC Playwrights Workshop, under the guidance of playwright-in-residence Steve Carter, who strongly influenced his work. About Carter, Williams has said "that no single individual has influenced my writing to the degree that Steve Carter has."

Home
Williams' comedy Home was mounted by the Negro Ensemble Company at St. Mark's Playhouse from 1979 to 1980, moving to Broadway's Cort Theatre from May 7, 1980, to January 4, 1981. The play earned nominations for both the Tony Award and the Drama Desk Award.

1980s
Williams went on to play Matthew Henson in the historical drama TV movie Cook and Peary: The Race to the Pole (CBS, 1983). He starred in the PBS American Playhouse dramas Denmark Vesey (1985; title role) and The Adventures of Huckleberry Finn (as Jim; 1986).  In the mid-1980s he appeared in television series including The New Mike Hammer, 227, and Frank's Place, a CBS dramedy for which he also served as a story editor. His film work during this time included a role in Blood Simple (1984).

Williams wrote the PBS productions Kneeslappers (1980) and Experiment in Freedom (American Playhouse, 1985); episodes for the series Cagney and Lacey, The New Mike Hammer, Miami Vice, and  The Fresh Prince of Bel Air; the "John Henry" episode of the Showtime cable network series Shelley Duvall's Tall Tales and Legends; and the NBC special Motown Returns to the Apollo (1986), among other work.  He wrote a CBS series pilot titled Lenny's Neighborhood.

1990s–present
Williams wrote and directed the comedy The Dance on Widows' Row, produced by the New Federal Theatre at Manhattan's Harry De Jur Playhouse at Henry Street Settlement from June 25 - July 30, 2000.

In 2006, Williams held auditions for his play The Waiting Room, to be performed that spring at the Raleigh Little Theatre's Gaddy-Goodwin Teaching Theatre in Raleigh, North Carolina.

In 2011, The Black Rep of Saint Louis, Missouri produced the world premier of his play The Montford Point Marine, starring J. Samuel Davis.  Montford Point was where the first black Marines trained.

Williams is Artist-in-Residence at North Carolina Central University, where he teaches classes on equity theater and the art of playwriting. His producing for television also includes story-editing and script-writing for the CBS television series Frank's Place in 1987–88, ABC-TV's Hangin' with Mr. Cooper, NBC-TV's The Fresh Prince of Bel-Air, the short-lived UPN sitcom series Good News and the Fox TV sitcom series Martin.

Awards and honors
 1980 Tony Award Nomination - Best Play: Home, written by Samm-Art Williams
 1980 Drama Desk Award Nomination - Outstanding New Play: Home, written by Samm-Art Williams
 1985 Emmy Award Nomination - Outstanding Writing in a Variety or Music Program, for Motown Returns to the Apollo (shared with fellow writers Buz Kohan and Peter Elbling)
 1988 Emmy Award Nomination - Outstanding Comedy Series, Frank's Place (as story editor; shared with executive producers Hugh Wilson and Tim Reid, producers Max Tash and David Chambers and co-producer Richard Dubin)
 Fellowships from the Guggenheim Foundation and the National Endowment for the Arts
 2010 NC Literary Hall of Fame Induction

References

External links

1946 births
Living people
African-American screenwriters
African-American television producers
20th-century American dramatists and playwrights
African-American dramatists and playwrights
Writers from North Carolina
People from Burgaw, North Carolina
21st-century American dramatists and playwrights
20th-century American male writers
21st-century American male writers
American male dramatists and playwrights
20th-century African-American writers
21st-century African-American writers
African-American male writers